Egidijus Varnas (born 31 July 1975) is a Lithuanian football forward currently playing for FK Ekranas.

Varnas made two appearances for the Lithuania national football team during 2001.

References

1975 births
Living people
Lithuanian footballers
Lithuania international footballers
A Lyga players
FC Šiauliai players
FK Ekranas players
Lithuanian expatriate footballers
Expatriate footballers in Israel
Association football forwards